Mbulu is a town in Tanzania and the capital of the Mbulu District. Mbulu may also refer to
Mbulu Highlands in north-central Tanzania
Mbulu white-eye, a bird found in Kenya and Tanzania
Christian Mbulu (1996–2020), British football defender
Letta Mbulu (born 1942), South African jazz singer